Enzo Magnanini (7 May 1935 – 4 March 1968) was an Italian football goalkeeper who played in Serie A with A.S. Bari and F.B.C. Unione Venezia.

Career
Born in San Lazzaro Parmense, Parma, Magnanini began playing professional football with local Serie B side Parma F.C. in 1954. He joined rivals A.S. Bari in 1957. Magnanini enjoyed the best spell of his career with Bari as he became the starting goalkeeper following promotion to Serie A. Later, he returned to Serie A with Venezia and had a second stint with Parma. In 1966, he joined Carrarese Calcio for one season. His last season was with A.C. Perugia Calcio.

On 16 December 1968, Magnanini was returning from Perugia's match in Potenza when he died in an auto accident at age 32.

References

External links
Profile at Enciclopediadelcalcio.it

1935 births
1968 deaths
Italian footballers
Parma Calcio 1913 players
S.S.C. Bari players
Venezia F.C. players
Carrarese Calcio players
A.C. Perugia Calcio players
Road incident deaths in Italy
Association football goalkeepers